Srikanta Acharya is a Kolkata-based modern Bengali singer-songwriter and music director. Srikanta was born in Kolkata, India and is son of Rohini Nandan Acharya and Kana Acharya. He got formal training in Rabindrasangeet from Dakshinee. He also got trained in tabla from Ustad Ali Ahmed Khan. He quit his job as a sales professional and then Utpal Chakravarty, proprietor of an old music store convinced him to drop in his cassettes at Sagarika Music. He got a call from them within a week and they offered him a contract to sing for them. Srikanta Acharya is now a household name across the world among audiences who listen to Bengali music. Musical life of Srikanta started from the world of Bengal culture. He is an qualitative songs-tan of Bengal music.

Studio albums
 Ami Noi
 Ghuri (Anandabazar Best Puja Album of the year 2004)
 Jibon Chhobi (Best Rabindrasangeet Music Award 2004)
 Yeh Chahat (Hindi)
 Nodir Chhobi Anki (Anandabazar Best Album of the year 2001)
 Bristi Tomake Dilam (Anandabazar Best Puja Album of the year 2000)
 Nil Dhrubotara
 Kono Ekdin
 Nivrito Praner Debota (Rabindrasangeet)
 Anubhabe jenechilem (Rabindrasangeet)
 Kachhei Achhi
 Hridoy Aamar (Rabindrasangeet)
 Knaach Kaataa Hire
 Roudrochhaya
 Smritir Soroni (Remake Compilation)
 Apon Gaan (Rabindrasangeet)
 Sanj Sakaler Robi (Rabindrasangeet)
 Moner Janala
 Uttoron (Rabindrasangeet)
 Musafirana (First ever album of Contemporary Bangla Ghazal, in Bengali Music)
 Onek Diner Gaan (Rabindrasangeet...solo album released after 11 years in 2014)

Albums (collaborative) 
 Sruti Gitobitan (along with Rezwana Chowdhury Bannya and others)
 Ganbela (with Lopamudra Mitra)
 Bhalobasi (with Sreeradha Bandyopadhyay) (2005)
 Shapmochan (with Lopamudra Mitra)
 Pather Saathi (with Rajeeb Chakraborty) (Highest Selling Bengali Album of the year 2003)

As Playback Singer
 Chotushkone (2014)
 Jaatishwar (2014)
 Iti Mrinalini (2011)
 Noukadubi  (2011)
 Bangal Ghoti Phataphati (Unreleased)   (2009)
 Tomar Jonyo (2008)
 Antarotamo (2008)
 Mon Amour: Shesher Kobita Revisited (2008)
 Chalo Let's Go (2008)
 Khela (2008)
 Titli (2001)
 Antaheen (2007)

As Music director 
 Krishnakanter Will

As voiceover artist 
 Chha-e Chhuti
Jaatishwar
Tonic

References

Discographies of Indian artists